Chequered Flag is a racing video game developed by Psion Software and published by Sinclair Research in 1983. It was the first driving game published for the ZX Spectrum and one of the first computer car simulators.

Gameplay
Chequered Flag allows a player to select a racing track and one of three cars; two with manual gears and one automatic. Two of the cars are named Ferretti and McFaster, in reference to Ferrari and McLaren, who had come first and second in the 1982 Formula One season.

Tracks available include Brands Hatch, Circuit de Monaco, Österreichring, Autodromo Nazionale Monza, Circuit Paul Ricard, Silverstone Circuit and 4 fictitious circuits.

The game is viewed in first-person perspective, from the driver's seat, with each car having a different dashboard layout. With no other cars to race, the aim is to complete laps in the best time possible, avoiding road hazards such as oil and broken glass. The player must also economise fuel and avoid the engine overheating. The game was one of the first to feature pit stops, which would repair damage and take on fuel.

Reception

On its initial release, Your Spectrum praised the driver's view graphics, with Popular Computing Weekly praising the smooth scrolling, with Your Spectrum agreeing. ZX Computing summarised the game as "realistic,... exciting and highly enjoyable".

In 1985, CRASH magazine described the graphics as adequate and the gameplay as good, but felt it was more serious than fun due to the lack of other racers. Sinclair User said it was up to the usual Psion standards, and that "the quality of the game and the detail included make it one of the great games for the Spectrum."

In their 1990 retrospective of driving games, Your Sinclair also lamented the lack of other racers, describing the game as "a bit like Pole Position without any other cars to race against." However, they praised the realism of the simulation, considering the age of the game. The game reached number one in the UK sales charts, ahead of Manic Miner, and being replaced by Jet Set Willy.

Trivia
In Poland, the game was released as Wyścigi szosowe (Highway races).

References

External links

1983 video games
Racing video games
Racing simulators
ZX Spectrum games
ZX Spectrum-only games
Video games set in Kent
Video games set in Austria
Video games set in France
Video games set in Italy
Video games set in Monaco
Video games developed in the United Kingdom